Kevin Fajardo Martínez (born 5 September 1989) is a Costa Rican football defender who currently plays at A.D.R. Jicaral.

International career
He was included in the Costa Rica national football team for the 2011 Copa América, but did not play at all in the tournament.

References

External links

1989 births
Living people
People from Limón Province
Association football defenders
Costa Rican footballers
Costa Rican expatriate footballers
2011 Copa Centroamericana players
2011 Copa América players
Santos de Guápiles footballers
Cobán Imperial players
C.S. Cartaginés players
A.D. Carmelita footballers
Municipal Grecia players
A.D.R. Jicaral players
Costa Rica international footballers
Costa Rican expatriate sportspeople in Guatemala
Expatriate footballers in Guatemala